Krzewina may refer to the following places in Poland:
Krzewina, Lower Silesian Voivodeship (south-west Poland)
Krzewina, Masovian Voivodeship (east-central Poland)
Krzewina, Greater Poland Voivodeship (west-central Poland)
Krzewina, Warmian-Masurian Voivodeship (north Poland)